Teejay Arunasalam is a British playback singer and actor who has worked in Tamil language films. After making his acting debut in the Tamil film Asuran (2019), he has been in films including Thatrom Thookrom (2020) and the anthology web series Putham Pudhu Kaalai Vidiyaadhaa (2022).

Career
Born in the area of Northolt in London to Sri Lankan Tamil immigrants, Teejay became interested in music through Carnatic classes and his pursuit of a GCSE qualification in music technology. He rose to fame in the European Tamil diaspora through his work as a singer on independent Tamil music albums in the early 2010s. He worked on albums with US-based singer Pragathi Guruprasad, and other UK-based singers such as Inno Genga and Arjun. He went on to pursue a degree in airport and airline management at university, before switching to study music.

Teejay announced that he would make his acting debut in the Tamil film industry through Amsana, a low-budget romantic drama, made by a cast and crew of debutants during August 2016. The film was later stalled but Teejay stayed in Chennai to try and pursue his career as a playback singer. He was then cast in the lead role of Thatrom Thookrom (2020) during December 2017 by debutant director Arul. The film's production was delayed and it subsequently had a limited release in late 2020, as Teejay's second release.

Teejay won critical acclaim for his role as Velmurugan in Vetrimaaran's Asuran (2019), appearing as the son of the characters portrayed by Dhanush and Manju Warrier. He was cast in the film after being referred to Vetrimaaran by his friend, actress Andrea Jeremiah. Teejay won positive reviews for his depiction. He later appeared in Balaji Mohan's short film in the anthology series Putham Pudhu Kaalai Vidiyaadhaa by Amazon Prime.

As of 2022, Teejay is working on Pathu Thala (2022), where he appears in a supporting role in an ensemble cast headed by Silambarasan, Gautham Karthik and Kalaiyarasan. He will also appear in a leading role in an untitled film co-produced by director A. L. Vijay, where he features alongside actresses Vani Bhojan and Amritha Aiyer.

Teejay has often reported his inclusion as an actor in larger film projects to the media, though he later did not feature. This included projects such as Ajay Gnanamuthu's Cobra (2022), Mani Ratnam's Ponniyin Selvan: II (2023), the biopic of Muttiah Muralitharan titled 800, and an untitled film by Gautham Vasudev Menon.

Filmography

As actor

As playback singer

References

External links

Tamil actors
Living people
Actors in Tamil cinema
British male singer-songwriters
British people of Sri Lankan Tamil descent
Sri Lankan Tamil musicians
Tamil playback singers
21st-century British singers
21st-century British male singers
1994 births